Obersee is the German word for "Upper Lake" and may refer to:

 Obersee (Antarctica), a meltwater lake in the Gruber Mountains, Antarctica
 Obersee (Arosa), a lake in the resort town of Arosa, Grisons, Switzerland
 Obersee (Glarus), a mountain lake in the canton of Glarus, Switzerland
 Obersee (Königssee), a mountain lake in southeastern Bavaria
 Obersee (Lake Constance), the larger of the two parts of Lake Constance
 Obersee (Zürichsee), a section of Lake Zürich, Switzerland
 Obersee (Rur), a reservoir in the Eifel mountains, Germany
 Obersee Nachrichten, a newspaper published in the area of Obersee
 Obersee, a previous name for the Egerner cove of the Tegernsee (lake) in Bavaria
 Obersee, an informal name for the upper part of the Weitsee lake in Bavaria

See also
Untersee (disambiguation)